Pinch is an unincorporated community in Stoney Creek Township, Randolph County, in the U.S. state of Indiana.

History
According to tradition, Pinch was so named because money was scarce in that community.

Geography

References

Unincorporated communities in Randolph County, Indiana
Unincorporated communities in Indiana